Bodnar or Bodnár is a surname. Notable people with the surname include:

Adam Bodnar, Polish Ombudsman
Alexandru Bodnar, Romanian archer
András Bodnár, Hungarian water polo player and freestyle swimmer
Andrew Bodnar (born 1954), English bass guitarist
Gizella Bodnár, Hungarian criminal
Gus Bodnar, Canadian ice hockey player
Janet Bodnar, American journalist
Lajos Bodnar, Hungarian sprint canoeist
László Bodnár, Hungarian footballer
Leslie Bodnar, American surgeon
Lisa Bodnar, American nutritional and perinatal epidemiologist
Łukasz Bodnar, Polish cyclist
Maciej Bodnar, Polish cyclist
Morris Bodnar, Canadian politician
Olga Bodnar, Ukrainian politician
Sándor Bodnár, Hungarian footballer
Vladimir Bodnar, Transnistrian politician

See also
Bondar